Yemmiganur is a town in Kurnool district of the Indian state of Andhra Pradesh. It is located in Yemmiganur mandal of Adoni revenue division.

It is famous for Vaggani bhajji..

History 

Yemmiganur is one of the major towns in the Kurnool district. It was part of the Vijayanagar from the 14th century to the 16th century. From 1953 to 1956 it was an Andhra state, now in part of Andhra Pradesh. In 1965 the Panchayat of Yemiganur was upgraded to a Municipality. Now it is a Grade -I Municipality. It is a city at present. The current MLA is K . Chennakesava Reddy (YSRCP).

Demographics 

The total population constitute,  males,  females and  children, in the age group of 0–6 years. The average literacy rate stands at 62.98% with  literates, significantly lower than the national average of 73.00%.

Transport 
The Andhra Pradesh State Road Transport Corporation operates bus services from Yemmiganur bus station.

Education
The primary and secondary school education is imparted by government, aided and private schools, under the School Education Department of the state. The medium of instruction followed by different schools are English, Telugu.

St.John's College of Engineering and Pharmaceutical Sciences is situated in Yerrakota near Yemmiganur.

See also
List of towns in Andhra Pradesh
Yemmiganur (Assembly constituency)

References 

Cities and towns in Kurnool district